Justin Campbell (born February 14, 2001) is an American professional baseball pitcher in the Cleveland Guardians organization.

Amateur career
Campbell attended Simi Valley High School in Simi Valley, California, where he played baseball. As a senior in 2019, he went 8-2 with a 1.17 ERA and 102 strikeouts over 65 innings alongside batting .409 with three home runs. He was selected by the Houston Astros in the 18th round of the 2019 Major League Baseball draft, but did not sign. Campbell originally committed to play college baseball at Tulane University, but due to changes in admission requirements, he was unable to attend, and instead enrolled at Oklahoma State University.

As a freshman at Oklahoma State in 2020, Campbell was named to the team's starting rotation and made four starts before the season was cancelled due to the COVID-19 pandemic. He returned to the starting rotation for the 2021 season, and on May 8, 2021, he threw the 11th no-hitter in school history in a 19-0 win over the Kansas Jayhawks, striking out 11 batters. He finished the 2021 season having started 13 games, going 7-2 with a 2.57 ERA and 102 strikeouts over 84 innings. He also appeared in 42 games as a designated hitter, batting .269 with one home run, and was one of the five finalists for the John Olerud Award. Following the season's end, he was named to the USA Baseball Collegiate National Team. For the 2022 season, Campbell stopped playing as a two-way player, and began focusing only on pitching. Over 17 games (16 starts) for the season, he went 9-2 with a 3.82 ERA and 141 strikeouts over  innings.

Professional career
Campbell was selected by the Cleveland Guardians with the 37th overall selection in the 2022 Major League Baseball draft. He signed with the team for $1.70 million.

References

External links
Oklahoma State Cowboys bio

2001 births
Living people
Baseball players from California
Baseball pitchers
Oklahoma State Cowboys baseball players
United States national baseball team players
All-American college baseball players